Shun Tak Fraternal Association Leung Kau Kui College is a government-funded secondary school, located in On Ting Estate, Tuen Mun, Hong Kong. The school was founded in 1981. The school is a member of the Shun Tak Fraternal Association group of schools. 
In 2008, STFA Leung Kau Kui College became the sister school of the Leung Kau Kui Vocational High School and First Middle School of Shunde, both located in Foshan, Guangdong Province, China. 
The school has 60 teachers, each class has a class teacher and an assistant teacher. 
All students are divided into four School Houses, namely: Man, Heng, Chung, and Shun House. The School Houses compete in Athletic Competitions, and other interhouse competitions.

Over the past 10 years, the school has achieved remarkable results in the Hong Kong Certificate of Education Examination (HKCEE), the Advanced Level Examination (HKALE) and the Hong Kong Secondary School Diploma Examination. Historically, 7 students received 10 A grades ("10 A Students") in the HKCEE (the highest grade possible on the HKCEE). In 2015, one student received 7 5** grades (the highest grade possible on the HKDSE).

External links

Official Site
NSS School Information Network
Hong Kong Examinations and Assessment Authority

Educational institutions established in 1981
Secondary schools in Hong Kong
Tuen Mun District